Cry for You may refer to:

 Cry for You – The Album, a 2009 album by September
 "Cry for You" (September song), 2006
 "Cry for You" (Jodeci song), 1993
 "Cry for You", a song by Arashi from the 2007 album Time

See also
 Cry for Me (disambiguation)
 Die for You (disambiguation)